"Y Yo Sigo Aquí" is a song recorded by Mexican singer Paulina Rubio for her fifth studio album, Paulina (2000). It was released as the third single from Paulina on November 1, 2000. It was released in January 2001 in the United States and Europe. Jointly written and composed by Estéfano, "Y Yo Sigo Aquí" is a dance-pop and techno-pop song along pulses with a synthesized house beat. It was one of the most successful songs of the year in the world and is recognized as one of Rubio's signature songs.

Composition
"Y Yo Sigo Aquí" lasts for four minutes and fourteen seconds.  It is composed in the key of C major and is set in time signature of common time, with a moderate tempo of 126 beats per minute. Lyrically, the track discusses a female who flirtatiousness to her crush, expressing her romantic interest and sexual.

In their book "The Latin Beat : The Rhythms And Roots Of Latin Music From Bossa Nova To Salsa And Beyond", Ed Morales labelled it a europop track that follow "vocal trend of a distorted voice that dominates European music, along pulses with a synthesized house beat", while Joey Guerra from Amazon album review claimed that it "showcase pulsing club rhythms." Most music specialists characterized it as a dance-pop song. Writing for the newspaper website El Periodico, the Catalan music critic Jordi Bianciotto identified the song "it mixed an incisive house rhythm with nods to Mexican folklore." He also said "Paulina sings with a distorted voice with ‘autotune’ very Cher," alluding to her song "Believe" of 1998.

Commercial performance 
"Y Yo Sigo Aquí" reached number one in several countries. In the United States, the song peaked at number three on the Billboard Hot Latin Songs chart on April 7, 2001, and became Rubio's best-reach US single since "Mío" (1993). In the same week, it reached number two on the Latin Pop Songs.

It is Rubio's strongest commercial breakthrough in the Europe, a region where she had previously achieved limited success.

Music video 
A music video for "Y Yo Sigo Aquí" was shot by Gustavo Garzón. It premiere on December, 2000, on MTV Español's The Clip List.

Awards and nominations
The song received a nomination for the Latin Grammy Award for Song of the Year at the 2001 ceremony.

The song and music video received Lo Nuestro Awards nominations in 2002.

Cultural impact 
According to the musical section of the Spanish tabloid Diario AS, "Y Yo Sigo Aqui" is considered one of Rubio's songs from the 2000s that marked a resounding success in Spain. Epik journalist María Lovera mentioned that "both in the melody and in the video clip [Rubio] marked a new stage in her career." Italian newspaper Il Giornale singled out the song as "one of the clearest examples of a summer catchphrase" that marked the summer of the early 2000s, and conquered Europe. "Y Yo Sigo Aqui" appear on the video games Black Bean Games Let's Dance With Mel B (2011).

Track listing and formats 

Mexican CD Single
 "Y Yo Sigo Aquí" – 4:13

Spanish CD Single
 "Y Yo Sigo Aquí" – 4:13

Spanish Remixes
 "Y Yo Sigo Aquí" (Album Version) – 4:13
 "Y Yo Sigo Aquí" (Radio Edit) – 3:15
 "Y Yo Sigo Aquí" (Radio TV) – 3:13
 "Y Yo Sigo Aquí" (Radio Instrumental) – 3:13
 "Y Yo Sigo Aquí" (Club Mix) – 7:07

Italian 12" Vinyl
 A-1. "Y Yo Sigo Aquí" (F&M Extended Version) – 4:58
 A-2. "Y Yo Sigo Aquí" (F&M Radio Version) – 3:33
 B-1. "Y Yo Sigo Aquí" (Album Version) – 4:16
 B-2. "Y Yo Sigo Aquí" (F&M Club Version) – 4:58

Italian Remixes
 "Y Yo Sigo Aquí" (Album Version) – 4:13
 "Y Yo Sigo Aquí" (Club Mix) – 7:07
 "Y Yo Sigo Aquí" (Club Radio Edit) – 3:15
 "Y Yo Sigo Aquí (Sexual Lover)" (Spanglish) – 3:57
 "Y Yo Sigo Aquí" (F&M Radio) – 3:32

European CD Single
 "Y Yo Sigo Aquí" (Album Version) – 4:13
 "Y Yo Sigo Aquí" (Club Mix) – 7:27

Charts

Weekly charts

Year-end charts

Release history

I'll Be Right Here (Sexual Lover)

Background and released 
On June 26, 2001, Rubio announced the surprise release of an English version of "Y Yo Sigo Aquí", after the great international success of the song and the wide audience reach around the world. The English-translation was adapted by Jodi Marr. "I'll Be Right Here (Sexual Lover)" was released on June 29, 2001.

Doug Morris, then Universal chairman/CEO, sent the song to WPOW (96.5 FM) Power 96 Miami as a "a first English-language single" and was hugely popular "predominantly female listenership", according to a Billboard article.

Following its commercial release on radio stations in the United States and Canada, the song was released in the United Kingdom and Europe in spring 2002. English electronic dance music record label Almighty Records released a remix of the demo version of and the song changed the titled to "Sexual Lover". They announced:

Finally, "I'll Be Right Here (Sexual Lover)" was included with Rubio's sixth studio album Border Girl.

Reception 
The music critics agreed that "I'll Be Right Here (Sexual Lover)" was a step towards a more dance sound. Frank Kogan from The Village Voice stated that the song "[is one] of the two great dance-sex tracks on Border Girl." According to Allmusic's Jose F. Promis, the sound capt a "Hi-NRG dance ditties." Joey Guerra from Amazon highlight the track as "the throbbing rhythm-club" of the album.

Commercially, "I'll Be Right Here (Sexual Lover)" reached top 50 singles chart in Czech Republic and becoming a hit on dance/electronic radio airplay in Russia. Rubio featured on the main cover of various artists compilation album Танцевальный Рай 14 (Dance Paradise 14) in 2003.

Music video 

Colombia director Simón Brand directed the music video for "I'll Be Right Here (Sexual Lover)", was produced by Juan Basanta and filmed in Punta Cana resort town in the easternmost province of the Dominican Republic. Rubio's looks — her youthfulness, slim figure and blonde hair – had attracted comments on her sexual image. Basanta said then that the story of the video is "an oil party that shows the arrival of the sun with music. Erotic and sensual." Rubio is portrayed as a sexual girl to the music, dancing all day until she and the backup people are excited. Music video premiere on MTV Polska on March, 2003.

The video begins with a DJ puts a record vinyl on the turntable. The next scene Rubio wake up in a bed around guys and girls while singing the song; they are soon joined by Rubio, who has wavy light-blonde hair and stunning. The setting changes to the beach where Rubio, wearing a leopard print bikini, dances with the guys. Then she goes to the water and starts flirting with the others. Again in the bar, Rubio dances between two girls who begin to put oil on her; now she is wearing an orange top and cutoff shorts. Some people take lollipops while she dances. Rubio and the guys dance and they meet on the floor. It alternates scenes featuring her entangled with a group of half-naked people. The video ends as she laughs and puts her arms around two girls.

In a retrospective review by Billboard staff they wrote, "she has always relished that bad-ass, hard-partying persona" and described her as the "Ultimate Party Girl" while "strutting in a cheetah print bikini." ¡Hola!s staff wrote "Paulina acts as the host of a great beach party where love and sensuality predominate."

The music video was known as "Sexual Lover" on music television networks. An "uncensored version" was published in English and Spanish and an "alternative version" of the Spanish version only.

Track listings and formatsUS CD single"I'll Be Right Here (Sexual Lover)" (Radio Edit) – 2:57UK CD single"I'll Be Right Here (Sexual Lover)" (Radio Edit) – 2:57
"Y Yo Sigo Aquí" (Spanglish Version) – 4:07
"Y Yo Sigo Aquí" (Album Version) – 3:59European CD, Maxi-Single, Enhanced"I'll Be Right Here (Sexual Lover)" (Radio Edit) – 3:59
"I'll Be Right Here (Sexual Lover)" (Baston & Burnz Mix) – 7:22
"Y Yo Sigo Aquí" (Berger & Bosh Mix) – 7:58
"I'll Be Right Here (Sexual Lover)" (Video) – 3:58UK CD 10th anyversary Almighty Records'
"Sexual Lover" (Almighty Radio Edit) – 3:25
"Sexual Lover" (Almighty Club Mix) – 7:27
"Sexual Lover" (Almighty Radio Edit 2) – 3:25
"Sexual Lover" (Almighty Club Mix) – 7:27

Charts

Release history

References

2001 singles
Paulina Rubio songs
Spanish-language songs
Songs written by Estéfano
2001 songs
Universal Music Latino singles
Song recordings produced by Estéfano